The 2003 Tampa Mayoral Election was held to elect the mayor of Tampa, Florida. Because no candidate received a majority of the vote, a runoff was held between the top-two finishers of the initial round. The election was won by Pam Iorio.

Polling

Results

First round

Runoff

Notes

References

Election 2003
2003
Tampa
Tampa
21st century in Tampa, Florida